Events in the year 2017 in Seychelles.

Incumbents
President: Danny Faure

Events

Deaths

8 January – James Mancham, politician (b. 1939).

References

 
2010s in Seychelles
Years of the 21st century in Seychelles
Seychelles
Seychelles